Lanxangia tsaoko, formerly Amomum tsao-ko, is a ginger-like plant known in English by the transliterated Chinese name. It grows at high altitudes in Yunnan, as well as the northern highlands of Vietnam. Both wild and cultivated plants are used medicinally and also in cooking. The dried fruit of the plant has a pungent, gingery taste.

It shows anti-quorum sensing and anti-biofilm activity on Staphylococcus aureus (Gram positive), Salmonella Typhimurium and Pseudomonas aeruginosa (Gram negative).

References

Alpinioideae